Real Man is a South Korean variety show featuring eight male celebrities as they experience life in the military, which is mandatory for all mentally sound and able-bodied Korean men for two years. The show debuted on MBC on April 14, 2013, as part of the Sunday Night programming block. The last episode of season 2 aired in November 27, 2016.

The original cast members were Kim Su-ro, Mir, Ryu Soo-young, Sam Hammington, Seo Kyung-suk and Son Jin-young. Jang Hyuk and Park Hyung-sik later joined the cast.

Mir left the show in June 2013. Ryu Soo-young, Son Jin-young and Jang Hyuk left the show in February 2014 and were replaced by Chun Jung-myung, Park Gun-hyung, K.Will, and Henry Lau.

A spin-off of this program called Real Man 300 began to air every Friday at 21:50 (KST) starting from September 21, 2018.

Male cast members

Season 1
(initial sort by debut date)

Season 2
(initial sort by debut date)

Main edition

Middle-age special

Friendly enlisting special

Comedian special

Navy NCO special

Manly Men special

Female cast members

Season 1

Edition 1

Edition 2

Season 2

Edition 3

Edition 4

Navy NCO special

Episodes

Awards and nominations

Notes

References

External links
  

2013 South Korean television series debuts
2016 South Korean television series debuts
MBC TV original programming
South Korean variety television shows
Korean-language television shows
South Korean military television series
Television series about the Republic of Korea Armed Forces